Seymour Ivan Rubinstein (born 1934) is an American businessman and software developer. With the founding of MicroPro International in 1978, he became a pioneer of personal computer software, publishing under it the extremely popular word processing package, WordStar. He grew up in Brooklyn, New York, and after a six-year stint in New Hampshire, later moved to California. Programs developed partially or entirely under his direction include WordStar, HelpDesk, Quattro Pro, and WebSleuth, among others. WordStar was the first truly successful program for the personal computer in a commercial sense and gave reasonably priced access to word processing for the general population for the first time.

Rubinstein began his involvement with microcomputers as director of marketing at IMSAI.

Early career 
During his teenage years, Rubinstein was a television repairman. After his military service he became a technical writer and continued his undergraduate studies at night.

In 1964, he was given the opportunity to participate in the design and implementation a classified system for identifying unknown vessels at sea by their sound fingerprint. Following his success with this and other related projects, he moved to New Hampshire to be put in charge of the computer software development for a line of IBM compatible programmable CRT terminals. As part of this assignment, Rubinstein went to San Francisco. Two years later, Rubinstein moved to the Bay Area and landed an assignment to implement a law office management system on a Varian Data Machines minicomputer. Following this, he formed the Systems Division of Prodata International Corporation which was subsequently acquired by Varian Data Machines. As a consequence, Rubinstein temporarily moved to Zürich, Switzerland to utilize the technology he developed as part of a branch banking system for Credit Suisse.

Upon his return to California, he visited the Byte Shop of San Rafael and began his love affair with the microcomputer.

Business ventures 
Rubinstein founded MicroPro International Corporation in June 1978. Subsequently, Rubinstein made an arrangement with Rob Barnaby, a programmer Rubinstein met at IMSAI. While at IMSAI, Barnaby wrote a screen editor which was called NED. Rubinstein had Barnaby totally rewrite NED into a new product, WordMaster. MicroPro was officially launched in September, 1978 using Barnaby’s first two programs, WordMaster and SuperSort. Feedback from the computer store dealers, who were MicroPro’s first customers, said they wanted a program with integrated printing.

Rubinstein developed the specifications for the new program including many innovations unavailable in commercial word processing at the time, such as showing page breaks, providing an integrated help system and a keyboard design specifically for touch typists. Barnaby did the initial foundation for MailMerge, which was finished by others.

In mid-1979 was born the Wordstar word processor. A year and a half later, several IMSAI employees joined Rubinstein at Micropro, including Bruce H. Van Natta, A. Joseph "Joe" Killian, Dianne Hajicek, and Glenn Ewing.

In 1982, WordStar was ported to DOS.

"So while WordMaster, SuperSort, and WordStar were developed on IMSAIs (I used mine til I got an IBM PC), few customers used them."
-- Rob Barnaby in email to Mike Petrie 2 May 2000

In 1987 Rubinstein became involved with a spreadsheet he called Surpass. This spreadsheet was later sold to Borland International, which renamed it Quattro Pro.

In 1990 Rubinstein was sued by Bill Millard, former CEO of IMSAI, regarding theft of trade secrets regarding WordStar. Rubinstein was successfully defended by Davis Wright Tremaine .

In a Video History Interview with David Allison of the Smithsonian Institution, Bill Gates referred to Rubinstein as starting one of the first software companies .

In 1992 he founded UDICO Holdings, a company which, using a "surveillance engine" licensed from a French company, sought to create an interactive context sensitive help engine which would intercept "F1" calls for help within Microsoft Word and direct users at that point to an interactive training session for the feature which they sought help with. Though this product (Developed by T. Lindgren and A. Bennedsen) was never released, the company did release a WinHelp authoring tool called W.Y.S.I. Help Composer.

In 1995 he founded a company called Prompt Software to investigate document management, internet research, and worked with Garnet R. Chaney to patent a series of discoveries regarding Content Discovery. This software connected to multiple search sites and used complex word algorithms to refine searches.

Improper credit 
Similar to many early pioneers in the software industry, Rubinstein is sometimes credited with writing the software that his companies have marketed. Some things Rubinstein is improperly credited with are:

Developing a BASIC compiler . The real BASIC compilers of the day were MBasic — Bill Gates' big success — and CBASIC by Gordon Eubanks. Rubinstein never had any involvement with a BASIC compiler. He was a COBOL man at that time.
Developing WordStar — The code was written by Rob Barnaby, who originally wrote a screen editor for IMSAI called NuEDit, (or NED). However, no part of the NED source code was used to develop a MicroPro program named WordMaster. The features that turned WordMaster (a programming editor, similar to vi in some ways) into WordStar, the common man's word processor, were mostly Rubinstein's.

"Seymour was the marketing brains — it was he that said we should address word processing to get a larger market. The defining change was to add margins and word wrap. Additional changes included getting rid of command mode and adding a print function. I was the technical brains — I figured out how to do it, and did it, and documented it. The product's success I think related both to it being the right product (Seymour) and to it being a fairly good implementation given the equipment (me)."
-- Rob Barnaby in email to Mike Petrie 3 May 2000

Developing Quattro Pro — The original Quattro Pro was a DOS program. The development environment, a Modula-2 compiler and a windowing system and a crude spreadsheet, were developed in Texas by a company started by Bob Warfield. Rubinstein bought that program and hired the developers and brought on Bob Richardson, former chief programmer at MicroPro to work on the compiler. Surpass (the program name) was developed in Novato, California by Bob Warfield, Dave Anderson, Weikuo Liaw, and Bob Richardson. Barnaby, from the WordStar days did a minor amount of work, as did Jim Fox. Surpass was developed by Surpass Software Systems and at one time was a major spreadsheet competitor as measured by P.C. Magazine. Surpass got great benchmarks and was popular, but due to a bad marketing division was never widely sold. Ingram was given an exclusive on the program but never sold it because Lotus was a major source of income for them. Surpass did not have the money to sue. Quattro was developed by Borland at about the same time sold considerably more units than Surpass and was probably profitable for Borland, but both products were clearly far behind the market leader Lotus. Phillipe Kahn saw the chance to double the development team and get some new technology ideas by buying the Surpass product at a bargain rate, giving him another shot at gaining the lead. So the entire operation was sold to Borland who moved the development to Santa Cruz and Scott's Valley. The Surpass codebase was converted to C and merged with existing Borland code from Quattro to form Quattro Pro, an extremely popular program, although the features such as Hot Links were largely first implemented in Surpass.
Developing WebSleuth — A widely used metasearch software for Windows 98. The actual code was written by Garnet R. Chaney and Bob Richardson (formerly of WordStar and Quattro Pro) with two weeks support from Karl Dukes and the team from Mediahut (Nottingham UK) with some interface re-design and installation improvements. This company suffered from a lack of funding. The marketing effort was spearheaded by Penelope Lamars. The product is still being developed by a new company called Intesoft Systems. Rubinstein is a principal in the new company.

References

External links 
 , personal
 Oral history interview with Seymour Rubenstein, Charles Babbage Institute. University of Minnesota.
 A Potted History of WordStar
 Fire-In-The-Valley Chronology with 1977 picture of Seymour
 Software vet plots comeback, 11 November 1996 San Francisco Business Times
 Starting Up Again — and Again and Again 25 August 1997
 Listing of American Software Pioneers
 WordStar 2000 in Unix Version
 

1934 births
Living people
People from Novato, California